

National team

FAW Premier Cup 

The FAW Premier Cup was discontinued, 2007-08 being the last season the competition was run.

Welsh Cup  

Bangor City won the 2009 Welsh Cup beating Aberystwyth Town 2–0 in the final.

Welsh League Cup  

The New Saints won the 2009 Welsh League Cup beating Bangor City 2–0 in the final.

Welsh Premier League 

 Champions: Llanelli
 Relegated to Cymru Alliance: Caernarfon Town

Welsh Football League Division One 

 Champions: Aberaman Athletic - not promoted as failed Welsh Premier League ground requirements.

Cymru Alliance League 

 Champions: Bala Town - promoted to Welsh Premier League

 
Seasons in Welsh football